Maya Ying Lin (born October 5, 1959) is an American designer and sculptor. In 1981, while an undergraduate at Yale University, she achieved national recognition when she won a national design competition for the planned Vietnam Veterans Memorial in Washington, D.C.

Lin has designed numerous memorials, public and private buildings, landscapes, and sculptures. Although best known for historical memorials, she is also known for environmentally themed works, which often address environmental decline. According to Lin, she draws inspiration from the architecture of nature but believes that nothing she creates can match its beauty.

Childhood
Maya Lin was born in Athens, Ohio. Her parents emigrated from China to the United States, her father in 1948 and her mother in 1949, and settled in Ohio before Lin was born. Her father, Henry Huan Lin, born in Fuzhou, Fujian, was a ceramist and dean of the Ohio University College of Fine Arts. Her mother, Julia Chang Lin, born in Shanghai, is a poet and a former professor of literature at Ohio University. She is the "half" niece of Lin Huiyin, who was an American-educated artist and poet, and said to have been the first female architect in modern China. Lin Juemin and Lin Yin Ming, both of whom were among the 72 martyrs of the Second Guangzhou uprising, were cousins of her grandfather. Lin Chang-min, a Hanlin of Qing dynasty and the emperor's teacher, fathered Lin Huiyin with his wife, while Maya Lin's father Henry Huan Lin was Lin Chang-Min’s illegitimate son with his concubine.

According to Lin, she "didn't even realize" she was ethnically Chinese until later in life, and that only in her 30s did she acquire an interest in her cultural background.

Lin has said that she did not have many friends when growing up, stayed home a lot, loved to study, and loved school. While still in high school she took courses at Ohio University where she learned to cast bronze in the school's foundry. She graduated in 1977 from Athens High School in The Plains, Ohio, after which she attended Yale University where she earned a Bachelor of Arts in 1981 and a Master of Architecture in 1986.

Environmental concerns 
According to Lin, she has been concerned with environmental issues since she was very young, and dedicated much of her time at Yale University to environmental activism. She attributes her interest in the environment to her upbringing in rural Ohio: the nearby Hopewell and Adena Indian burial mounds inspired her from an early age. Noting that much of her later work has focused on the relationship people have with their environment, as expressed in her earthworks, sculptures, and installations, Lin said, "I'm very much a product of the growing awareness about ecology and the environmental movement...I am very drawn to landscape, and my work is about finding a balance in the landscape, respecting nature not trying to dominate it. Even the Vietnam Veterans Memorial is an earthwork. All of my work is about slipping things in, inserting an order or a structuring, yet making an interface so that in the end, rather than a hierarchy, there is a balance and tension between the man-made and the natural."

According to the scholar Susette Min, Lin's work uncovers "hidden histories" to bring attention to landscapes and environments that would otherwise be inaccessible to viewers and "deploys the concept to discuss the inextricable relationship between nature and the built environment". Lin's focus on this relationship highlights the impact humanity has on the environment, and draws attention to issues such as global warming, endangered bodies of water, and animal extinction/endangerment. She has explored these issues in her recent memorial, called What Is Missing?

According to one commentator, Lin constructs her works to have a minimal effect on the environment by utilizing recycled and sustainable materials, by minimizing carbon emissions, and by attempting to avoid damaging the landscapes/ecosystems where she works.

In addition to her other activities as an environmentalist, Lin has served on the Natural Resources Defense Council board of trustees.

Vietnam Veterans Memorial

In 1981, at 21 and still an undergraduate student, Lin won a public design competition to design the Vietnam Veterans Memorial, to be built on the National Mall in Washington D.C. Her design, one of 1,422 submissions, specified a black granite wall with the names of 57,939 fallen soldiers carved into its face (hundreds more have been added since the dedication), to be v-shaped, with one side pointing toward the Lincoln Memorial and the other toward the Washington Monument. The memorial was completed in late October 1982 and dedicated in November 1982.

According to Lin, her intention was to create an opening or a wound in the earth to symbolize the pain caused by the war and its many casualties. "I imagined taking a knife and cutting into the earth, opening it up, and with the passage of time, that initial violence and pain would heal," she recalled.

Her winning design was initially controversial for several reasons: its minimalist design, her lack of professional experience, and her Asian ethnicity. According to one writer, "Some viewed her selection as an affront. They could not understand how a woman, a youth, and a Chinese American could design a memorial for men, for soldiers, and for Americans." Some objected to the exclusion of the surviving veterans' names, while others complained about the dark complexion of the granite, claiming that it expressed a negative attitude towards the Vietnam War. Lin defended her design before the US Congress, and a compromise was reached: The Three Soldiers, a bronze depiction of a group of soldiers and an American flag were placed to the side of Lin's design.

Notwithstanding the initial controversy, the memorial has become an important pilgrimage site for relatives and friends of the dead soldiers, many of whom leave personal tokens and mementos in memory of their loved ones. In 2007, an American Institute of Architects poll ranked the memorial No. 10 on a list of America's Favorite Architecture, and it is now one of the most visited sites on the National Mall. Furthermore, it now serves as a memorial for the veterans of the Afghanistan and Iraq wars. There is a collection with items left since 2001 from the Vietnam Veterans Memorial Fund, which includes handwritten letters and notes of those who lost loved ones during these wars. There is also a pair of combat boots and a note with it dedicated to the veterans of the Vietnam War, that reads "If your generation of Marines had not come home to jeers, insults, and protests, my generation would not come home to thanks, handshakes and hugs."

Lin once said that if the competition had not been held "blind" (with designs submitted by name instead of number), she "never would have won" on account of her ethnicity. Her assertion is supported by the fact that she was harassed after her ethnicity was revealed, as when prominent businessman and later third-party presidential candidate Ross Perot called her an "egg roll."

Later work

Lin, who now owns and operates Maya Lin Studio in New York City, has designed numerous projects following the Vietnam Veterans Memorial, including the Civil Rights Memorial in Montgomery, Alabama (1989) and the Wave Field outdoor installation at the University of Michigan (1995). Lin is represented by the Pace Gallery in New York City.

A partial list of works

 Peace-Chapel (completed in 1989), for the Baker Institute for Peace and Conflict Studies and Juniata College. Lin was approached by Elizabeth Evans Baker to design the open-aired chapel, perched on top of a mountain. The chapel represented in one place the connections between peace, art, spirituality, and nature. The site consists of a circle of stones for “pews,” the ground of the earth for a floor, and the boundless sky for a ceiling overhead. ​Located on Baker-Henry Nature Preserve in Huntingdon, PA.

 Wave Field (completed in 1995), for the University of Michigan. Lin was inspired by both diagrams of fluids in motion and photographs of ocean waves. She was intrigued by the idea of capturing and freezing the motion of water and wished to capture that movement in the earth rather than through photography. Wave Field was her first experiment with earthworks.

 Confluence Project (completed in 2000), a series of outdoor installations at historical points along the Columbia River and Snake River in the states of Washington and Oregon.

 Eleven Minute Line (completed in 2004), an earthwork in Sweden that was designed for the Wanås Foundation. Lin drew inspiration from the Serpent Mounds (Native American burial mounds) located in her home state, Ohio. It is meant to be a walkway for the viewers to experience, taking eleven minutes to complete. The work was inspired by Robert Smithson's Spiral Jetty.

 A new plaza (completed in 2005), at the Claire Trevor School of the Arts at the University of California, Irvine.

 Waterline (completed in 2006), composed of aluminum tubing and paint. Lin has described the piece as a drawing instead of a sculpture. It is a to-scale representation of the Mid-Atlantic ridge, and it is installed so that viewers may walk on the underwater mountain range. One critic saw in the work a purposeful ambiguity as to where the actual water line was in relation to the mountain range, which highlighted the viewers' relationship to the environment and the effect they had on bodies of water.

 Bodies of Water series (completed in 2006), consisting of representations of three bodies of water, "The Black Sea," "The Caspian Sea," and "The Red Sea". Each sculpture is made of layers of birch plywood, and are to-scale representations of three endangered bodies of water. The sculptures are balanced on the deepest point of the sea. Lin wished to call attention to the "unseen ecosystems" that people continue to pollute.

 Input (with Tan Lin, completed in 2004). Lin was commissioned by Ohio University to design what is known as Input in that institution's Bicentennial Park, a landscape designed to resemble a computer punch card. The work relates to Lin's first official connection with the university. The daughter of the late Professor Emerita of English Julia Lin and the late Henry Lin, dean emeritus of the College of Fine Arts, Maya Lin studied computer programming at the university while in high school. The installation is located in a 3.5-acre park. It has 21 rectangles, some raised and some depressed, resembling computer punch cards, a mainstay of early programming courses.

 Above and Below (completed in 2007), an outdoor sculpture at the Indianapolis Museum of Art in Indiana. The artwork is made of aluminum tubing that has been electrolytically colored by anodization.

 2 × 4 Landscape (completed in 2008), a 30-ton sculpture made of many pieces of wood, which was exhibited at the M.H. de Young Memorial Museum, in San Francisco. The sculpture itself is evocative of the swelling movement of water, which is juxtaposed with the dry materiality of the lumber pieces. According to Lin, 2 × 4 Landscape was her attempt to bring the experience of Wavefield (1995) indoors. The 2 × 4 pieces are also meant to be reminiscent of pixels, to evoke the "virtual or digital space that we are increasingly occupying."

 Wave Field, (completed in 2008), at the Storm King Art Center in New York state. It is the center's first earthwork, spanning 4 acres of land, and is a larger version of her original Wave Field (1995) that focuses on the "fusion of opposites," comparing the motion of water to the material of the earth.

 Design of a building (2009) for the Museum of Chinese in America, near New York City's Chinatown. Lin said that she found the project to be personally significant, explaining that she wants her two daughters to "know that part of their heritage".

 Silver River (2009), her first work of art in the Las Vegas Strip. It is part of a public fine art collection at MGM Mirage's CityCenter, which opened December 2009. Lin created an  cast of the Colorado River made entirely of reclaimed silver. With the sculpture, Lin wanted to make a statement about water conservation and the importance of the Colorado River to Nevada in terms of energy and water. The sculpture is displayed behind the front desk of the Aria Resort and Casino.

 A Fold in the Field (completed in 2013). Her largest work to date, it was built from 105,000m cubic meters of earth, covering 3 hectares. It forms part of a private collection within a sculpture park, owned by Alan Gibbs, north of Auckland, New Zealand.

 Since around 2010, Lin has been working on what she calls "her final memorial," the What Is Missing? Foundation, to commemorate the biodiversity that has been lost in the planet's sixth mass extinction. She aims to raise awareness about the loss of biodiversity and natural habitats by using sound, media, science, and art for temporary installations and a web-based project. What Is Missing? exists not in one specific site but in many forms and in many places simultaneously.

 From 2015 to 2021, Lin worked on the renovation and reconfiguration of the Neilson Library and its grounds at Smith College. A project in Madison Square Park, "Ghost Forest," was postponed until 2021.

 Both What is Missing and the Vietnam Veterans Memorial were referred to by the White House in its press release that announced Lin as one of the 2016 recipients of the Presidential Medal of Freedom. Nature and the environment have been central concerns for Lin in both her art and architecture: "As an artist I often work in series, and so for me, I wanted my last memorial to be on a subject that I have personally been concerned with and connected to since I was a child. The last memorial is "What Is Missing?" And encompasses multiple platforms, with temporary and permanent physical installations as well as an interactive online component." She has expressed her concerns for the goals of the Trump administration: "I think nature is resilient— if we protect it—and with my background I wanted to lend a voice to the incredible threat we are under from climate change and species and habitat loss."

Exhibitions

 Il Cortile Mare (1998-1999), an exhibition of furniture design, maquettes and photos of works at the American Academy in Rome.

Written works
 Maya Lin, Boundaries (New York: Simon & Schuster, 2000).

Design methodology

Maya Lin calls herself a "designer," rather than an "architect". Her vision and her focus are always on how space needs to be in the future, the balance and relationship with the nature and what it means to people. She has tried to focus less on how politics influences design and more on what emotions the space would create and what it would symbolize to the user. Her belief in a space being connected and the transition from inside to outside being fluid, coupled with what a space means, has led her to create some very memorable designs. She has also worked on sculptures and landscape installations, such as “Input” artwork at Ohio University. In doing so, Lin focuses on memorializing concepts of time periods instead of direct representations of figures, creating an abstract sculptures and installations.

Lin believes that art should be an act of any individual who is willing to say something that is new and not quite familiar. In her own words, Lin's work "originates from a simple desire to make people aware of their surroundings, not just the physical world but also the psychological world we live in." Lin describes her creative process as having a very important writing and verbal component. She first imagines an artwork verbally to understand its concepts and meanings. She believes that gathering ideas and information is especially vital in architecture, which focuses on humanity and life and requires a well-rounded mind. When a project comes her way, she tries to "understand the definition (of the site) in a verbal before finding the form to understand what a piece is conceptually and what its nature should be even before visiting the site". After she completely understands the definition of the site, Lin finalizes her designs by creating numerous renditions of her project in model form. In her historical memorials, such as the Vietnam Veterans Memorial, the Women's Table, and the Civil Rights Memorial, Lin tries to focus on the chronological aspect of what she is memorializing. That theme is shown in her art memorializing the changing environment and in charting the depletion of bodies of water. Lin also explores themes of juxtaposing materials and a fusion of opposites: "I feel I exist on the boundaries. Somewhere between science and art, art and architecture, public and private, east and west.... I am always trying to find a balance between these opposing forces, finding the place where opposites meet... existing not on either side but on the line that divides."

Personal life
Lin was married to Daniel Wolf (1955–2021), a photography dealer and collector. She has homes in New York and rural Colorado, and is the mother of two daughters, India and Rachel. She has an older brother, the poet Tan Lin.

Recognition
Lin has been awarded honorary doctorate degrees from Yale University, Harvard University, Williams College, and Smith College. In 1987, she was among the youngest to be awarded an honorary Doctorate of Fine Arts by Yale University.

In 1994, she was the subject of the Academy Award-winning documentary Maya Lin: A Strong Clear Vision. Its title comes from an address she gave at Juniata College in which she spoke of the monument design process in the origin of her work; "My work originates from a simple desire to make people aware of their surroundings and this can include not just the physical but the psychological world that we live in."

In 2002, Lin was elected Alumni Fellow of the Yale Corporation, the governing body of Yale University (upon whose campus sits another of Lin's designs, the Women's Table, designed to commemorate the role of women at Yale University), in an unusually public contest. Her opponent was W. David Lee, a local New Haven minister and graduate of the Yale Divinity School, who was running on a platform to build ties to the community with the support of Yale's unionized employees. Lin was supported by Yale President Richard Levin and other members of the Yale Corporation, and she was the officially endorsed candidate of the Association of Yale Alumni.

In 2003, Lin was chosen to serve on the selection jury of the World Trade Center Site Memorial Competition. A trend toward minimalism and abstraction was noted among the entrants and the finalists as well as in the chosen design for the World Trade Center Memorial.

In 2005, Lin was elected to the American Academy of Arts and Letters, as well as the National Women's Hall of Fame in Seneca Falls, New York.

President Barack Obama awarded Lin the National Medal of Arts in 2009 and the Presidential Medal of Freedom in 2016.

In 2022, the Smithsonian's National Portrait Gallery in Washington, D.C. announced the first biographical exhibition, "One Life: Maya Lin," dedicated to Lin, noting her contributions as architect, sculptor, environmentalist, and designer of the Vietnam Veterans Memorial.

Awards and honors 

 1999: Rome Prize
 2000: Golden Plate Award of the American Academy of Achievement
 2003: Finn Juhl Prize
 2005: elected to The American Academy of Arts and Letters
 2005: elected to National Women's Hall of Fame in Seneca Falls, New York
 2007: AIA Twenty-five Year Award
 2009: National Medal of Arts
 2011: Thomas Jefferson Medal in Architecture, awarded jointly by the Thomas Jefferson Foundation and the University of Virginia.
 2014: The Dorothy and Lillian Gish Prize, a $300,000 art prize
 2016: Presidential Medal of Freedom

Selected works
 Vietnam Veterans Memorial (VVM) (1980–82), Washington, D.C.
 Aligning Reeds (1985), New Haven, Connecticut
 Civil Rights Memorial (1988–89), Montgomery, Alabama
 Open-Air Peace Chapel (1988–89), Juniata College, Huntingdon, Pennsylvania
 Topo (1989–91), Charlotte Sports Coliseum, Charlotte, North Carolina
 Eclipsed Time (1989–95), Pennsylvania Station, New York City
 Women's Table (1990–93), Yale University, New Haven, Connecticut
 Weber House (1991–93), Williamstown, Massachusetts
 Groundswell (1992–93), Wexner Center for the Arts, Columbus, Ohio
 Museum for African Art (1992–93), New York City
 Wave Field (1993–95), FXB Aerospace Engineering Building, University of Michigan, Ann Arbor, Michigan
 10 Degrees North (1993–96), Rockefeller Foundation Headquarters, New York City
 A Shift in the Stream (1995–97), Principal Financial Group Headquarters, Des Moines, Iowa
 Reading a Garden (1996–98), Cleveland Public Library, Cleveland, Ohio
 Private Duplex Apartment, New York City (1996–98), New York
 Topographic Landscape (1997) (Portable sculpture)
 Phases of the Moon (1998) (Portable sculpture)
 Avalanche (1998) (Portable sculpture)
 Langston Hughes Library (1999), Clinton, Tennessee
 Timetable (2000), Stanford University, Stanford, California
 The character of a hill, under glass (2000–01), American Express Client Services Center, Minneapolis, Minnesota
 Ecliptic (2001), Grand Rapids, Michigan
 Input (2004), Bicentennial Park, Athens, Ohio
 Riggio-Lynch Chapel (2004), Clinton, Tennessee
 Arts Plaza, Claire Trevor School of the Arts (2005), Irvine, California
 Confluence Project: Cape Disappointment State Park (2006)
 Above and Below, Indianapolis Museum of Art (2007)
 Confluence Project: Vancouver Land Bridge (2008)
 Confluence Project: Sandy River Delta (2008)
 Confluence Project: Sacajawea State Park (2010)
 Ellen S. Clark Hope Plaza, Washington University in St. Louis (2010)
 Confluence Project: Chief Timothy Park (2011)
 A Fold in the Field (2013), The Gibbs Farm, Kaipara Harbour, New Zealand
 "What is Missing? (2009–present), (Various locations, web project)
 Under the Laurentide, Brown University (2015)
 Folding the Chesapeake (part of Wonder exhibit): Renwick Gallery, Washington, DC (2015)
 Neilson Library (2021), Smith College, Northampton, Massachusetts (redesign)
 Ghost Forest (2021), Madison Square Park, New York, New York

Further reading
 
 Maya Lin: [American Academy in Rome, 10 dicembre 1998-21 febbraio 1999] (1998) 
 Timetable: Maya Lin (2000) ASIN B000PT331Y (2002)
  (2006)
 Landscape Architecture (2/2007), page 110–115, by Susan Hines

References

External links

 Mayalin.com, Main site for Maya Lin Studio
 Biography, interviews, essays, artwork images and video clips from PBS series Art:21 -- Art in the Twenty-First Century Season 1 (2001)
 Pace Gallery
 Maya Lin video produced by Makers: Women Who Make America
 

1959 births
Living people
American artists of Chinese descent
American architects of Chinese descent
American women artists of Chinese descent
American landscape and garden designers
Vietnam Veterans Memorial
Artists from New York City
Artists from Ohio
Members of the American Academy of Arts and Letters
Members of Committee of 100
People from Athens, Ohio
United States National Medal of Arts recipients
Vietnam War
Yale University alumni
Yale School of Architecture alumni
American women architects
20th-century American women artists
Presidential Medal of Freedom recipients